Bijar Bagh (also Romanized as Bījār Bāgh) is a village in Layl Rural District, in the Central District of Lahijan County, Gilan Province, Iran. At the 2006 census, its population was 336, in 104 families.

References 

Populated places in Lahijan County